This article is about the technical specifications of various Creative MuVo series media players. The models listed here are organized by their release date with the older models at the top to the newer models at the bottom. All models use flash memory except the MuVo² & the MuVo² FM, which use hard drive.

Models
MuVo
 Capacity: 32 MB (32 MiB) / 64 MB (64 MiB) / 128 MB (128 MiB)
 Power: One AAA battery
 Interface: USB 1.1
 Notes: Re-released as "MuVo Mix", below. LED indicator in lieu of display.

MuVo NX
 Capacity: 128 MB (128 MiB) / 256 MB (256 MiB)
 Power: One AAA battery
 Interface: USB 1.1
 Notes: First model with an LCD display.

MuVo USB 2.0
 Capacity: 128 MB (128 MiB) / 512 MB(512 MiB) / 1 GB (1 GiB)
 Power: One AAA battery
 Interface: USB 2.0
 Notes: LED indicator in lieu of display.

MuVo TX
 Capacity: 128 MB (128 MiB), 256 MB (256 MiB), 512 MB (512 MiB)
 Power: One AAA battery
 Interface: USB 2.0
 Notes: Voice recorder. First model with USB 2.0.

MuVo TX FM
 Capacity: 128 MB (128 MiB), 256 MB (256 MiB), 512 MB (512 MiB), 1 GB (1 GiB)
 Power: One AAA battery
 Interface: USB 2.0
 Notes: Voice recorder, FM radio

MuVo V200
 Capacity: 128 MB (128 MiB), 256 MB (256 MiB), 512 MB (512 MiB), 1 GB (1 GiB)
 Power: One AAA battery
 Interface: USB 2.0
 Notes: FM radio, voice recorder

MuVo Sport C100
 Capacity: 128 MB (128 MiB), 256 MB (256 MiB)
 Power: One AAA battery
 Interface: USB 2.0
 Notes: Splash-proof, stopwatch functionality

MuVo Slim
 Capacity: 128 MB (128 MiB), 256 MB (256 MiB), 512 MB (512 MiB), 1 GB (1 GiB)
 Power: Removable lithium-ion battery
 Interface: USB 2.0
 Notes: FM radio, voice recorder

MuVo² XT
 Capacity: 512 MB (512 MiB)
 Power: Removable lithium-ion battery
 Interface: USB 2.0

MuVo²
 Capacity: 1.5 GB (1.5GiB), 4 GB (4 GiB)
 Power: Removable lithium-ion battery
 Interface: USB 2.0

MuVo² FM
 Capacity: 1.5 GB(1.5 GiB), 4 GB (4 GiB), 5 GB (5 GiB)
 Power: Removable lithium-ion battery
 Interface: USB 2.0
 Notes: FM radio, Integrated voice recorder with built-in microphone

MuVo Mix
 Capacity: 256 MB (256 MiB), 512 MB (512 MiB), 1 GB (1 GiB)
 Power: One AAA battery
 Interface: USB 2.0
 Notes: Shuffle feature

MuVo Micro N200/ZEN Nano/Nano Plus
 Capacity: 128 MB (128 MiB), 256 MB (256 MiB), 512 MB (512 MiB), 1 GB (1 GiB)
 Power: One AAA battery
 Interface: USB 2.0
 Notes: FM radio, voice recorder, line-in encoding (directly encodes mp3 files from an external source)

MuVo Chameleon
 Capacity: 1 GB (1 GiB)
 Power: One AAA battery
 Interface: USB 2.0
 Notes: 10 interchangeable coloured face-plates, FM radio, voice recorder

MuVo Vidz
 Capacity: 512 MB (512 MiB), 1 GB (1 GiB)
 Power: lithium-ion battery
 Interface: USB 2.0
 Notes: Colour OLED display, FM radio, voice recorder, line-in encoding, MPEG-4 video playback, JPEG photo display

MuVo V100
 Capacity: 1 GB (1 GiB), 2 GB (2 GiB)
 Power: One AAA battery
 Interface: USB 2.0 (Full Speed) not High Speed USB 2.0 (loads with 300 kB/s)
 Notes: voice recorder, lyric display, directory navigation, delete file, remembers paused state after turning off

MuVo S200
 Capacity: 256 MB (256 MiB), 512 MB (512 MiB), 1 GB (1 GiB)
 Power: One AAA battery
 Interface: USB 2.0
 Notes: Orange PLED display, FM radio, voice recorder, lyric display

MuVo T100
 Capacity: 2 GB (2 GiB), 4 GB (2 GiB)
 Power: Removable lithium-ion battery
 Interface: USB 2.0
 Notes: Screenless, controls similar to ZEN Stone, bass boost ####on

MuVo T200
 Capacity: 2 GB (2 GiB), 4 GB (4 GiB)
 Interface: USB
 Notes: LCD display, FM radio, voice recorder

MuVo 10
 Capacity: 0 B
 Power: Built in Li-on battery
 Interface: Bluetooth, Micro USB
 Notes: Bluetooth, AUX in, Screenless, Speakerphone

MuVo 20
 Capacity: 0 B
 Power: Built in Li-on battery
 Interface: Bluetooth, Micro USB
 Notes: Bluetooth, AUX in, Screenless, Speakerphone

MuVo 2
 Capacity: Depends on MicroSD
 Power: Built in Li-on battery
 Interface: Bluetooth, Micro USB
 Notes: Bluetooth, AUX in, Screenless, Speakerphone, MicroSD Card

MuVo 2c
 Capacity: Depends on MicroSD
 Power: Built in Li-on battery
 Interface: Bluetooth, Micro USB
 Notes: Bluetooth, AUX in, Screenless, Speakerphone, MicroSD Card

See also
 Creative NOMAD
 Creative Technology
 Creative Zen

External links
 Creative Labs - MuVo Players

Digital audio players
Portable media players
Creative Technology products

ja:Creative MuVo
pl:Creative Labs MuVo